Art of the Duo is an album by jazz pianist Mal Waldron and saxophonist Jim Pepper recorded in 1988 and released on the German Tutu label.

Track listing 
All compositions by Mal Waldron except where noted.
 "Ticket to Tokyo" — 4:49 
 "Ruby, My Dear" (Thelonious Monk) — 6:45 
 "Bathing Beauties" (Jim Pepper) — 6:18 
 "Over the Rainbow" [Take One] (Harold Arlen, Yip Harburg) — 2:27 
 "Over the Rainbow" [Take Two] (Arlen, Harburg) — 3:23 
 "Spinning at Trixi" — 6:34 
 "Good Bait" (Tadd Dameron) 6:54 
 "You're No Bunny Unless Some Bunny Loves You" (Pepper, Waldron) — 4:12 
 "A Pepper Poem, Pt. 1" (Jim Pepper) — 2:05 
 "A Pepper Poem, Pt. 2" (Jim Pepper) — 2:10 
 "Willy's Blues" (Jim Pepper) — 4:45 
 "What Is This Thing Called Love?" (Cole Porter) — 5:56 
 "How Long Has This Been Going On?" (George Gershwin, Ira Gershwin) — 6:33 
 "Indian Water" (Jim Pepper) — 7:21
Recorded at Trixi Studios in Munich, West Germany on April 5 & December, 1988

Personnel 
 Mal Waldron — piano
 Jim Pepper — tenor saxophone. soprano saxophone

References 

1989 albums
Mal Waldron albums